Ron Edmundo Dantes is a prestigious cuban rum brand produced in Santiago de Cuba. Only 3000 bottles are issued every year. It is a 40% rum, has a golden color and has a little vanilla taste.

Two kinds of rum are proposed: 
 The 15 years old in a 0.7L glass bottle
 The 25 years old in a 0.7L porcelain bottle hand decorated with 24 carat gold (150 delivered bottles every year for Spain)

The name of the brand comes from the Count of Monte Cristo book.

See also
List of rum producers

References

Cuban alcoholic drinks
Cuban brands
Drink companies of Cuba
Rums